Sarbath is a 2021 Indian Tamil-language comedy drama television film written and directed by Prabhakaran on his directorial debut and produced by Lalit Kumar of 7 Screen Studio while creative produced by Viacom18. The film stars Kathir, Soori, Rahasya Gorak and Ashvatt in lead roles. The film is set on the backdrop of Chinnalapatti near Dindigul. The film is based on the antics of two families, resulting in fun and turmoil in tandem. The film was directly released via Colors Tamil on 11 April 2021.

Plot 

Arivu works as an IT professional in Chennai. He visits his village on a holiday in order to attend his elder brother's wedding, only to realise that the wedding has been called off. Arivu discovers that the girl whom he has fallen in love with is actually the one who was supposed to marry his elder brother. With the help of his friend he struggles to win over his love.

Cast
Kathir as Arivu
Soori as Arivu's friend
Rahasya Gorak as Aruna
Ashvatt as Senthil
Vivek Prasanna as Anbu
Siddharth Vipin as Aalavanthan
G. Marimuthu as Arivu and Anbu's father
Florent Pereira as Aruna's father
Indhumathi as Arivu and Anbu's mother
Baby Joy
Suhasini

Production 
The film was announced by debutant director Prabhakaran who earlier worked as an assistant director for renowned filmmaker Balaji Sakthivel. Kathir was roped into play the lead role as an IT professional while Soori was roped into play the pivotal role as friend of Kathir in the film. It also marked the maiden collaboration between Kathir and Soori. The film title and first look poster for the film were unveiled on 17 June 2019 and the filming was also completed in the latter part of 2019. The film was predominantly shot in Dindigul and few portions of the film were also shot in Chennai.

Soundtrack
Soundtrack was composed by Ajesh.
Unnal Unardhene - Haricharan, Ajesh
Theera Theera - Ajesh, Saindhavi
Adhirum Veeradhi - Mahalingam, Diwakar, Ajesh
Karichan Kuyile - Ajesh

Release and reception 
The theatrical released of the film was delayed for months due to the COVID-19 pandemic despite the shooting being completed in 2019. The film was telecasted directly on Colors Tamil on 11 April 2021.

Cinema Express wrote "Just like the raging summer is briefly forgotten while gulping down a chilled glass of sarbath, this Sarbath too offers a decent detour from the rigours of our life and harks back to a time when people entered a cinema hall to forget everything and laugh. In Sarbath, the cinema screen is replaced by our televisions, and while the laughs don’t always come… thankfully, the smiles stay long enough".

References 

2020s Tamil-language films
2021 comedy-drama films
2021 films
Indian comedy-drama films
Indian television films
2021 television films
2021 directorial debut films
Comedy television films
Drama television films
Films not released in theaters due to the COVID-19 pandemic
Films shot in Chennai